Diler Holding, is a conglomerate, founded by Mustafa Yazıcı during 1949, in Turkey with businesses in iron and steel, energy, ports, banking, and tourism. Due to its large coal-fired power station in Turkey it is a large private sector greenhouse gas emitter in Turkey.

Operations 
Diler Holding activities involve iron and steel manufacturing, energy production, port operations, banking, and tourism. It owns the Cornelia Deluxe Resort and Cornelia Diamond Golf Resort and Spa, both in Antalya. Its subsidiary Atlas Enerji Üretim A.Ş. owns the 1,200 MW coal-fired İskenderun power station in Hatay Province. Climate Trace estimates the coal-fired power plant emitted over 1% of the country’s  greenhouse gas in 2021.

References 

Conglomerate companies of Turkey
Holding companies of Turkey
Companies based in Istanbul
Coal companies of Turkey
Electric power companies of Turkey